Sangolli is a village in Bailahongal taluk of Belgaum district Indian State of  Karnataka, India. This is the birthplace of prominent warrior, Rayanna, from Karnataka, India. He was the army chief of the Kingdom of Kittur ruled at the time by Rani Chennamma and fought the British East India Company till his death. His life was the subject of the 2012 Kannada film Sangolli Rayanna.

It is located around 45 km from Belagavi city and around 500 km from the capital of Karnataka.

References

Villages in Belagavi district